Rockhill may refer to:

 Rockhill, County Limerick in Ireland
 East Rockhill Township, Pennsylvania in the United States
 West Rockhill Township, Pennsylvania in the United States
 Rock Hill, Missouri in the United States
 Rock Hill, South Carolina in the United States
 Rockhill, Pennsylvania, a borough in Huntingdon County, Pennsylvania
 Rockhill, Texas, an unincorporated community in Collin County, Texas
 Rockhill, Shropshire, a place in Shropshire, England
 William Woodville Rockhill

See also
Rock Hill (disambiguation)